Devhelp is a GTK/GNOME browser for API documentation; it works natively with gtk-doc (which is the API reference format for GTK/GNOME documentation).

It is integrated in GNOME development tools such as GNOME Builder, Glade and Anjuta, and is an official application of the GNOME project. Devhelp uses Bonobo for integration to Emacs via command line searches and is embedded in other development applications such as Anjuta.

Devhelp uses the GTK port of WebKit for HTML rendering of documentation; versions prior to 0.22 used Gecko, a layout engine developed by Mozilla Corporation and used in the Firefox web browser.

References

External links

 GNOME Devtools Devhelp home page
 gtk-doc

GTK
GNOME Developer Tools
Software that uses GTK
Free computer libraries
Online help